William Teague House is a historic home located near Siler City, Chatham County, North Carolina. It was built in several sections built at various times during the first half of the 19th century. The property consists of a two-story log cabin dating from the 1820s-1830s; a -story, one room log section; and a rear shed and side frame addition.  The house exhibits vernacular Federal and Greek Revival design elements. Also on the property are a contributing small corn crib and a smokehouse.

It was listed on the National Register of Historic Places in 1985.

References

Log houses in the United States
Houses on the National Register of Historic Places in North Carolina
Federal architecture in North Carolina
Greek Revival houses in North Carolina
Houses completed in 1850
Houses in Chatham County, North Carolina
National Register of Historic Places in Chatham County, North Carolina
Log buildings and structures on the National Register of Historic Places in North Carolina